Marigje Degrande (born 7 August 1992) is a Belgian chess player born in Bruges, Belgium. She earned the title of Woman FIDE Master by winning the Women's FIDE World Amateur Chess Championship in October, 2021 with a score of 7.5/9, coming shared first in the Open category U2000.

Chess competitions and tournaments 
Marigje Degrande has won the Women's Belgian Chess Championship for youngsters several times.
She was the three time consecutive winner of the Belgian Chess Championship in the Women's category in the years 2006, 2007 and 2008. She came shared first in the Women's U14 category of the European Union Championship in Austria. She participated in several European and World Championships. She became Women's World Champion U2000 after scoring 7,5/9 in the FIDE World Amateur Chess Championship, coming shared first in the Open category. This earned her the WFM title.

Notable games 
CM Mahammed Saed Laily
Dogu Hasim
Ehab Mohamed
Astrelin Evgeny
WIM Arlette Van Weersel

References

External links

Marigje Degrande at 365Chess.com

1992 births
Living people
Belgian chess players
Sportspeople from Bruges